The following is an on stage and screen filmography of the English stage actor Jeremy Irons; he is known for his work on stage, theatre, film, and television.

Theatre
Following his training at the Bristol Old Vic Theatre School Irons first acted with the school's theatre company:

Film

Television

References

External links 
 
 
 Jeremy Irons at the Turner Classic Movies database

Male actor filmographies
British filmographies